Ukrainian records in athletics are the Ukrainian athletes' results which Ukrainian Athletics acknowledges to be the best in certain athletics events. The procedure for ratification of Ukrainian national records is largely based on the approach taken by IAAF in ratifying the world records and is set out in the Regulations for Ukrainian National Records in Athletics approved by the Council of the Ukrainian Athletics on 16 September 2017.

Ukrainian Athletics maintains national records in five age categories: under-16; under-18; under-20; under-23; senior. A record in each age category can be either absolute (i.e., achieved on an outdoor or indoor facility) or indoor.

The list of events, in which Ukrainian Athletics maintains national records, in principle conforms to those, in which IAAF and EAA ratify the world records and European records respectively, subject to the following distinctions:
 Unlike IAAF and EAA, Ukrainian Athletics ratifies:
 absolute records in 35 kilometres road race walk
 indoor records in a women's 5000 metres race walk and a men's 10,000 metres race walk
 indoor records in 3000 metres steeplechase
 Ukrainian Athletics does not maintain national records in a mixed-gendered 4 × 400 metres relay

Key to tables

Outdoor

Men

Women

Mixed

Indoor

Men

Women

References

External links 
UAF web site
 
 
 
 
 

Ukraine

Athletics